For a European Serbia was a big tent and pro-EU electoral alliance, led by Boris Tadić, which participated in the 2008 Serbian parliamentary election. It received 38.42% of the popular vote, translating into 102 seats in the 250-seat Parliament of Serbia.

History

2008 parliamentary election
President of Serbia, Boris Tadić has gathered a large pro-EU coalition for the 2008 parliamentary election, around his centre-left Democratic Party (DS) and centre-right G17 Plus. On the list 166 candidates are from DS, 60 from G17+ and 8 members from each of the following minor parties Social Democratic Party of Serbia (SDPS) and League of Social Democrats of Vojvodina (LSV). 25 seats are guaranteed for G17+, 4 seats and a Ministry in the future government for both SDPS and Serbian Renewal Movement (SPO) and 3 seats for LSV. However, if the alliance wins over 100 seats, their seats will gradually increase. The list's name is For a European Serbia – Boris Tadić and its leader is Dragoljub Mićunović. Boris Tadić claimed victory at the election, despite only gaining a plurality.

The victory was contested by the opposing Tomislav Nikolić, of the far-right Serbian Radical Party (SRS), which received 29.46% of the popular vote. In the election aftermath, ZES alliance formed a big tent coalition government together with the SPS-PUPS-JS electoral alliance and ethnic minority parties (Hungarian Coalition, List for Sandžak) on 7 July 2008, after securing 128 seats in the 250-seat parliament. This coalition government ruled Serbia until the 2012 elections.

2008 presidential election
On 3 February 2008, Boris Tadić won in the second round of the presidential election, for the second time, his opponent Tomislav Nikolić, of the far-right SRS. He held that position until April 5, 2012,
when he resigned, and scheduled new presidential elections, which would coincide with the parliamentary election on 6 May 2012.

Coalition members

Electoral results

Parliamentary election

Presidential election

References

External links
For a European Serbia – Boris Tadić

Defunct political party alliances in Serbia
Pro-European political parties in Serbia